Emergency Squad is a 1940 American adventure film directed by Edward Dmytryk.

Cast
 William Henry as Peter Barton
 Louise Campbell as Betty Bryant
 Richard Denning as Dan Barton
 Robert Paige as Chester 'Chesty' Miller
 Anthony Quinn as Nick Buller
 John Miljan as Slade Wiley
 John Marston as Lt. Murdock
 Joseph Crehan as H. Tyler Joyce, editor
 Barbara Barondess as 	Ada Miller

References

External links
 

1940 films
1940 adventure films
American black-and-white films
Films directed by Edward Dmytryk
American adventure films
Paramount Pictures films
1940s English-language films
1940s American films